C41 or C-41 may be:

Vehicles 
 C-41 (rocket), an Italian sounding rocket
 Alfa Romeo Racing C41, an Italian Formula One car
 CASA C-41, a Spanish light transport aircraft in use by the United States Armed Forces
 Courage C41, a French racing car
 Douglas C-41, an American military transport aircraft

Other uses 
 C-41 process, for developing colour negative film
 C41 road (Namibia)
 Bone tumor
 Caldwell 41, the Hyades star cluster
 Philidor Defence, a chess opening